Solinftec is a global ag-tech company specializing in providing technologies for agribusiness. The company is headquartered in Araçatuba, São Paulo, Brazil.

History 
In 2007, Solinftec was founded by a group of Cuban automation engineers in Araçatuba, Brasil. The company's first product was a machine monitoring system that allowed sugar and ethanol mills to optimize their production processes sending information in real-time. In 2011, the company developed the first solution to traceability for certification of production origin.

In 2012, the company launched sugarcane harvesting optimization system.

In 2013, the company developed SolinfNet, a communication network between devices that allows data transmissions in remote regions where is no internet connection.

In 2017-2018 got undisclosed investments from TPG and Agfunder.  In 2020, Solinftec received a US$40 million investment in a series B round and a year later started partnership with IBM.

In 2022, the company launched Solix Ag Robotics, a robot that analyse the health of plants and assesses their nutritional content, looks for weeds, and evidence of insect damage. Also, the device monitors the state of the entire field's ecosystem.  

In Cali, Colombia, the office serves as a hub for Latin America, where the company operates in six countries.

References 

Agriculture companies of Brazil